Money Moron is a Canadian television series hosted by Gail Vaz-Oxlade. Similar to her first two shows, Til Debt Do Us Part and Prince$$, Vaz-Oxlade helps people with money and debt problems. In Money Moron, a "moron" is nominated by someone to get help to be more financially responsible. If they follow through and do all of the challenges Vaz-Oxlade gives them, they will receive up to $10,000. The purpose is not just to solve their money problems but to heal the relationship between the person nominated and the one who nominated them.

Episodes
Season 1:

Season 2:

References

External links
 Program page on Slice

2010s Canadian reality television series
Slice (TV channel) original programming
2013 Canadian television series debuts
Personal finance education
2013 Canadian television series endings